Unni Lis Jorunn Drougge, née Wennberg (born 1 April 1956) is a Swedish author, columnist and journalist. At an early age she dropped out of high school and started working at a kibbutz in Israel. Later she moved back to Sweden and got a degree in psychology. During the 1980s, she lived a green way life in Hörby, Skåne along with her then husband Mats Drougge.

They published the underground magazine April and founded SAMAE – Sammanslutningen av medvetet arbetsskygga element, a satirical movement about Sweden's work-politics. Since 1991, Unni Drougge is living in Stockholm.

Bibliography
 Jag, jag, jag, 1994 (debut)
 Andra sidan Alex, 1996
 Regnbågens tid, 1997
 Heroine, 1998
 Meningen med män, 1999
 Hella Hells bekännelser, 2001
 Slyngstad Events, 2002
 Lutherska Badet, 2003
 Penetrering, 2006
 Boven i mitt drama kallas kärlek, 2007
 Bluffen, 2010
 Förkunnaren, 2011
 Kärlek ända in i döden, 2011

References

External links

Living people
1956 births
People from Lund
Swedish women journalists
Swedish columnists
Swedish women columnists
Swedish expatriates in Israel